Pilodeudorix aruma, the small red playboy, is a butterfly in the family Lycaenidae. It is found in Nigeria, Cameroon, Gabon, the Republic of the Congo, the Central African Republic, the Democratic Republic of the Congo and Uganda. The habitat consists of primary forests.

Subspecies
Pilodeudorix aruma aruma (Nigeria: Cross River loop, Cameroon, Gabon, Congo, Central African Republic)
Pilodeudorix aruma nigeriana Libert, 2004 (eastern Nigeria)
Pilodeudorix aruma pallidior Libert, 2004 (Central African Republic, western Uganda)
Pilodeudorix aruma simplex (Schultze, 1917) (Democratic Republic of the Congo)

References

External links
Die Gross-Schmetterlinge der Erde 13: Die Afrikanischen Tagfalter. Plate XIII 65 h

Butterflies described in 1873
Deudorigini
Butterflies of Africa
Taxa named by William Chapman Hewitson